ShoppingTown Mall was a regional shopping mall in Dewitt, New York. First opened as an open-air shopping center in 1954, it was enclosed in 1973 and remained a major shopping center before being thrown out of business in March 2020 to make way for a new $400 million development, which will be named District East. Much of the existing mall will be demolished for a phased development that includes a substantial residential component, a movie theater complex, a “premium” grocer, specialty retail, and services like doctors and medical offices. The project will also include new sidewalks, bike paths, walking trails, and large park and green space that will serve as a spearhead to the recently enhanced Empire State Trail.

History

Open-Air Shopping Center 
Shoppingtown Mall began as an open-air shopping center, first announced in August 1953 and managed by Eagan Real Estate Inc. At this time, tenants including F. W. Woolworth, J. C. Penney, Walgreens, Grand Union, Acme Markets, Fanny Farmer, Endicott Johnson, and Kinney Shoes had already signed on to the project. Local Syracuse department store Addis' signed onto the project in February 1954, and later that month a four-day grand opening gala was announced, set to begin March 3. The center opened as planned on March 3 with most major tenants, with Addis opening later on October 8, 1954. Multiple new stores, including Flah & Co, W. T. Grant, and a Kallet Theater, began construction in 1955-1956.

A Dey's Store For Homes was first announced in 1960, with plans for the home store to open by 1961, with a full store projected to open at a later date. The home store opened August 25, 1962, followed by the full store which opened on October 11, 1966. The center was affected by a fire in April 1967, which most affected Flah & Co, who remained closed for over a month to completely restock and remodel the store. A branch store of Syracuse department store E.W. Edwards & Sons opened in November 1968. A new 2-screen Kallet Theater opened December 28, 1968.

Mall Conversion 
Shoppingtown began conversion into an "all-climate mall" in late 1973, with Edwards planned to be one of the anchors, though Edwards closed its doors amidst bankruptcy on November 7, 1973. The mall suffered a fire in June 1974, which fatally injured one firefighter and caused an estimated $500,000 in damages, primarily to W.T. Grant. The two-screen Kallet theater was purchased by Carrols Development Corp in 1974, and operated as a Cinema National. Woolworth also announced the closure of its Shoppingtown store on December 31, 1974. Rumored since shortly after the store's closing in 1973, J. C. Penney opened a new, larger store in the former Edwards on January 22, 1975. Both Flah & Co and Addis' opened new stores at the mall, said to be double the size of their previous locations in the center. The mall opened on August 4, 1975, with a week-long grand opening ceremony.

Enclosed Mall 
Woolworth's re-joined the mall in 1978, taking over the former W.T. Grant space in mid-August. The mall saw an expansion in 1984, adding a  Chappell's as an anchor, which opened October 3. Addis merged with Dey Brothers in May 1989, with plans to close the Addis store at the mall, and merge operations into the existing Dey Brothers store. Shortly after this, Wilmorite Properties gained control of the mall through a partnership with Eagan in Summer 1989, announcing a major remodel later that year.

The remodel was completed at a cost of $53 million in 1991, adding a new wing which included a relocated Addis & Dey store and a food court, with the original Addis & Dey store being split between TJ Maxx in 1991 and Steinbach's in 1992. Addis & Dey announced the closure of their Shoppingtown Mall store amidst bankruptcy in 1992. Shortly thereafter in early 1993, Kaufmann's announced it would relocate from Fayetteville Mall to the former Addis & Dey space. Woolworth's closed for the second and final time in early 1993. Steinbach's closed July 1, 1994, after recording hundreds of thousands in losses at the store, and TJ Maxx relocated to the Fayetteville Mall. Sears took over both floors of the former Addis & Dey space, in addition to building a new auto center. Media Play was announced in April 1994, taking over the former Woolworth's and Kallet Theater spaces for a  location. The Bon-Ton came to the mall with their acquisition of Chappell's in late 1994.

Old Navy opened in January 2000, and Dick's Sporting Goods was announced in March that year.  Shoppingtown Mall was one of several properties sold to Macerich by Wilmorite in late 2004 for $2.3 billion. Kaufmann's became Macy's in September, 2006. In March 2007, Macerich announced plans to create an open-air plaza with new shops facing Erie Boulevard East in the Sears wing, though this never materialized perhaps due to the economic recession. 

The later 2010's saw multiple traditional chain anchors update their brick-and-mortar fleets after being disrupted by digital retailers in recent years.
On March 2015, Macy's, which maintains a much larger outpost at Destiny USA, announced as part of a strategy to focus on their highest achieving locations that they would be the first anchor store to go. On October 2015, Dick's Sporting Goods closed its ShoppingTown Mall store and relocated to a nearby store at DeWitt Commons. In April 2016, JCPenney announced that as part of modernizing their brick-and-mortar operations they'll throw in the towel and go out of business for good. On September 2, 2018 it was announced that Sears would be the last anchor store to permanently leave the mall as part of an ongoing plan to phase out of brick-and-mortar. The mall got tossed out of business as part of the COVID-19 response in March 2020. Rite Aid pulled out of ShoppingTown Mall on June 24, 2019 after losing its pharmacy on June 10, 2019. Moonbeam Capital served eviction notices to all remaining tenants in September 2020 to make way for a new $400 million development, which will be named District East. Much of the existing mall will be demolished for a phased development that includes a substantial residential component, a movie theater complex, a “premium” grocer, specialty retail, and services like doctors and medical offices.
The project will also include new sidewalks, bike paths, walking trails, and large park and green space that will serve as a spearhead to the recently enhanced Empire State Trail.

References

External links 

 

Shopping malls in New York (state)
Shopping malls established in 1954
Buildings and structures in Onondaga County, New York
DeWitt, New York
1954 establishments in New York (state)
2020 disestablishments in New York (state)
Companies that filed for Chapter 11 bankruptcy in 2019
Companies disestablished due to the COVID-19 pandemic
Defunct shopping malls in the United States
Shopping malls disestablished in 2020